Central Bucks High School South, also known as CB South, is a public high school serving students in tenth through twelfth grades, one of three high schools in the Central Bucks School District. The school is located in Warrington, Pennsylvania in Bucks County.

As of the 2018-19 school year, the school had an enrollment of 1,730 students and 103.95 classroom teachers (on an FTE basis), for a student–teacher ratio of 16.64:1. There were 128 students (7.4% of enrollment) eligible for free lunch and 12 (0.6% of students) eligible for reduced-cost lunch.

Completed in late 2004, the school opened in January 2005, so the first graduating class attended classes in the school only during the spring semester of that year. CB South is the most recent high school in the Central Bucks School District, following Central Bucks High School East and Central Bucks High School West. The high school hosts grades 10–12 and is built for just under 2,000 students. Its two feeder schools are Unami Middle School and Tamanend Middle School.

CB South is located on Folly Road. The school cost approximately $84 million to build and is the largest school in the Central Bucks School District.

Academics

CB South is ranked among the best high schools in Pennsylvania.  CB South students consistently place in the top 10% of the state in test scoring. The majority of students (87.7%) are Caucasian, with 6.6% Asian, 2.2% African American, and 2.6% Hispanic. The school recently received a grant from the state which they used to place SmartBoards with projectors, new laptops and new supplies for every classroom.  They spend about $9,500 on every student. Beginning in the 2019-2020 school year, after a successful pilot at Holicong Middle School, all sophomores and juniors received laptops as a part of the district’s 1:1 initiative for use in the classroom.

Athletics

CB South competes in the Pennsylvania Interscholastic Athletic Association, in the Suburban One Conference. The School offers 22 sports both boys and girls, with strengths in football, field hockey, boys/girls indoor and outdoor track, boys/girls basketball, girls soccer, softball, wrestling, and ice hockey. In Central Bucks South's inaugural year of 2004, it received its first state championship, in men's swimming. The school perennially competes at the state level in field hockey, softball, and boys and girls track. The football and soccer programs have also been highly competitive, with both consistently reaching the playoffs. In 2012, the Central Bucks South softball team was the first team sport to bring a PIAA AAAA State Championship back to Warrington. The Central Bucks South Ice Hockey team won the AA State Championship in 2014 and 2016.

Societal impact
In 2015, CB South gained national attention when the students selected two of their classmates with Down syndrome as Homecoming King and Queen.

Notable alumni 
 Josh Adams, running back for the USFL’s Michigan Panthers and a Philanthropist.

Images

References

External links
 Central Bucks South

Public high schools in Pennsylvania
Educational institutions established in 2004
Schools in Bucks County, Pennsylvania
2004 establishments in Pennsylvania